"Come See About Me" is a 1964 song recorded by the Supremes for the Motown label. The track opens with a fade-in, marking one of the first times the technique had been used on a studio recording.

The song became third of five consecutively released Supremes songs to top the Billboard pop singles chart in the United States (the others are "Where Did Our Love Go", "Baby Love", "Stop! In the Name of Love" and "Back in My Arms Again"). It topped the chart twice, non-consecutively, being toppled by and later replacing the Beatles' "I Feel Fine" in December 1964 and January 1965. The BBC ranked "Come See About Me" at #94 on The Top 100 Digital Motown Chart, which ranks Motown releases by their all time UK downloads and streams.

History

Overview
"Come See About Me" was written and produced by Motown's main production team Holland–Dozier–Holland.  It was recorded during a two week period in which the Supremes also recorded "Baby Love" after "Where Did Our Love Go" became their most successful single to date.  It was the #1 song on the Billboard Hot 100 singles chart for two separate weeks: December 13, 1964, to December 18, 1964, and January 10, 1965, to January 16, 1965, and reached the #3 position on the soul chart. Billboard said that the song has a "pronounced Detroit beat, steady and exacting" and that the "Gals weave silky and controlled vocal through beat."  Cash Box described it as "a pulsating stomp-a-rhythmic...that the gals carve out in ultra-commercial manner" and in which the group was "in top-of-the-chart form."

The Supremes were the first to record the song, but were not the first to issue it as a single. That distinction fell to Nella Dodds, and her version started selling, climbing to #74 on the Billboard Hot 100 singles chart, but Motown Records quickly released the Supremes' version as a single, which killed sales for Nella Dodds. Cash Box described Dodds' version as "an exciting pop-r&b, choral-backed handclap-shuffler about a gal who pleads for her ex-boyfriend to return to her," saying that Dodds is "a new talent who promises to be an important wax name in the coming weeks."

The Supremes made their first of 17 appearances live on the popular CBS variety program The Ed Sullivan Show performing this single on Sunday, December 27, 1964.

The group also recorded a German version of the song, entitled "Johnny und Joe".

Personnel
 Lead vocals by Diana Ross
 Background vocals by Florence Ballard and Mary Wilson
 All instruments by the Funk Brothers
Earl Van Dyke – piano
Joe Messina – guitar
James Jamerson – bass
Uriel Jones – drums
Jack Ashford – vibraphone
Hank Cosby – tenor saxophone 
Andrew "Mike" Terry – baritone saxophone 
 Footstomps by Mike Valvano

Chart performance

Weekly charts

Year-end charts

Certifications

Other versions
 The Supremes recorded a German-language version of the song, titled "Jonny und Joe" as the b-side of the 1965 single "Thank You Darling" (also sung in German) in Germany, Switzerland and the Netherlands. "Jonny und Joe" was later included on two various Motown artists compilation albums Motown Around the World (1987, 1CD) and Motown Around the World: The Classic Singles (2010, 2CD) and also on Diana Ross & the Supremes compilation 50th Anniversary: The Singles Collection 1961–1969 (2011, 3CD).
 In 1967, the song was a repeat hit for Motown act Jr. Walker & the All Stars, whose version reached the top 10 on the R&B chart and the top 25 on the pop chart.
 In 1987, Welsh rock and roll singer Shakin' Stevens covered it on his album Let's Boogie, making it a hit in the UK and Ireland. Shakin' Stevens version surpassed the Supremes' original #27 chart placing by reaching #24.
 In 2012, American musical dramedy Glee featured a cover of this song for its fourth season's Thanksgiving episode. The cover was recorded by Dianna Agron as her character Quinn Fabray with Naya Rivera and Heather Morris providing backup vocals.

See also
 List of Billboard Hot 100 number ones of 1964
 List of Billboard Hot 100 number ones of 1965

References

External links
 

1964 songs
1964 singles
1983 singles
The Supremes songs
Junior Walker songs
Carol Lloyd songs
Billboard Hot 100 number-one singles
Cashbox number-one singles
RPM Top Singles number-one singles
Songs written by Holland–Dozier–Holland
Song recordings produced by Brian Holland
Song recordings produced by Lamont Dozier
Motown singles
Shakin' Stevens songs
1967 singles
Song recordings produced by Johnny Bristol
Wand Records singles